Thorston Oppold is a paralympic athlete from Germany competing mainly in category T51 wheelchair racing events.

Thorston competed in four events at the 2000 Summer Paralympics in Sydney he won the bronze medal in the marathon as well as competing in the 400m, 800m and 1500m.  In 2004 Summer Paralympics he concentrated on the marathon but without any medal success.

References

Paralympic athletes of Germany
Athletes (track and field) at the 2000 Summer Paralympics
Paralympic bronze medalists for Germany
Living people
Year of birth missing (living people)
Medalists at the 2000 Summer Paralympics
Paralympic medalists in athletics (track and field)
German male wheelchair racers